Deng Ai (197 – late March 264), courtesy name Shizai, was a Chinese military general and politician of the state of Wei during the Three Kingdoms period of China. He is best known for his pivotal role in the Wei conquest of its rival state, Shu, in 263. He was described as a very loyal subject who made great contributions to Wei, but was also noted for his arrogance and audacity, which led to his downfall and death.

Born in a peasant family, Deng Ai started his career as a minor agricultural officer. Sometime between 235 and 239, he met Sima Yi, who recognised his talent and gave him a higher position in the civil service. Around this time, he also wrote a proposal on starting agricultural works in the Huai River region, and received credit for his ideas. Deng Ai gained greater prominence in Wei from 249 onwards after he joined the Wei general Guo Huai in stopping a Shu invasion. He also advised the regent Sima Shi on some issues. In 255, he participated in the suppression of a rebellion started by the generals Guanqiu Jian and Wen Qin, and was promoted to the status of a top general. From 255 to 262, he defended Wei's western borders in present-day Gansu from multiple incursions by the Shu forces led by the general Jiang Wei.

Deng Ai reached the pinnacle of his career in 263, when he led Wei forces to conquer Shu. By leading a strike force through a shortcut across dangerous mountainous terrain, Deng Ai showed up in the vicinity of the Shu capital, Chengdu, and took the enemy by surprise. After a failed attempt by the Shu general Zhuge Zhan to stop Deng Ai at Mianzhu, the Shu emperor Liu Shan voluntarily surrendered to Deng Ai and brought an end to the Shu state. Following his success in the Shu campaign, Deng Ai became arrogant about his achievements and showed disregard for the Wei government's authority. The Wei general Zhong Hui exploited and manipulated Deng Ai's arrogance to great effect. In 264, Deng Ai was arrested by Wei Guan and Zhong Hui, who were acting under order by the Wei regent Sima Zhao. He was placed in a prison cart and escorted to the capital Luoyang, but was killed en route by soldiers sent by Wei Guan. His sons were executed as well. His surviving family members were exiled but allowed to return in 266 after the Jin dynasty was established.

Early life and career
Deng Ai was from Jiyang County (棘陽縣), Yiyang Commandery (義陽郡), which is around present-day Xinye County, Henan. He was born towards the end of the Eastern Han dynasty and lost his father at a young age. When the warlord Cao Cao conquered northern Jing Province in 208, Deng Ai moved to Runan Commandery (汝南郡; in present-day southern Henan), where he lived as a farmer and raised cattle. When he was 11 years old, he and his mother passed by Chen Shi's tomb in Yingchuan Commandery (潁川郡; around present-day Xuchang, Henan). He read two lines engraved on Chen Shi's tombstone: "his writings became examples of excellent prose; his conduct served as a role model for scholar-officials" (文為世範，行為士則). He was so inspired that he wanted to change his given name to Fan (literally "(role) model") and his courtesy name to Shize (literally "for scholar-officials to emulate"). However, since the names Fan and Shize were already used by members of his extended family, he could not change his names as such because it would violate naming taboo.

Deng Ai later became an academician under the Commandant of Xiangcheng (襄城; present-day Xiangcheng County, Henan). However, he was not too successful in his career because he stuttered in his speech. He then switched his job to an agricultural officer in charge of grain and fodder. The locals pitied him for his poor family background and often provided him with financial aid. Deng Ai initially did not show any form of gratitude towards them. Whenever he saw mountains and lakes, he started gesturing and pointing out how and where he believed army camps should be laid out, but was scorned by others. Later on, he was promoted to a clerical position which put him in charge of maintaining records of agricultural output.

Deng Ai had an acquaintance, Shi Bao, who was about the same age as him. They were quite close to Guo Xuanxin, who served as an Internuncio. When Ji Ben, an imperial physician, started a rebellion in Xu (許; present-day Xuchang, Henan) in 218, Guo Xuanxin was implicated and initially placed under house arrest until an officer came to escort him to the imperial capital for trial. Deng Ai and Shi Bao were among the escorts. While travelling for about ten li, Guo Xuanxin chatted with them along the way and remarked that the two of them would become very capable officials in the future. Deng Ai was later promoted to the rank of an Agricultural Officer of Merit.

Sometime between 235 and 239, he was sent as a messenger to the capital, Luoyang, where, by chance, he met Sima Yi, who was then serving as the Grand Commandant under the Wei government. Sima Yi felt that Deng Ai was an extraordinary person so he recruited him and promoted him to the position of a Gentleman of Writing.

Agricultural and irrigation projects 
Around the time, the Wei state was planning to promote agriculture and stockpile food resources in preparation for military campaigns against its rival states, Shu and Wu. Deng Ai was sent to survey the lands from the east of Chen and Xiang commanderies (around present-day Zhoukou, Henan) to Shouchun (壽春; around present-day Shou County, Anhui), and assess their suitability for agriculture. He saw that the lands were fertile but lacked moisture, so they were not fully utilised. He suggested to dig irrigation channels to irrigate the land, and open up new canals for transporting goods by water.

Deng Ai wrote a proposal, the Ji He Lun (濟河論; Discussion on the River), to explain his ideas:  Sima Yi agreed with Deng Ai's proposal and implemented his ideas.

In 241, the agricultural projects were complete. Whenever there were battles in the southeast between Wei and Wu, the Wei forces could sail down the river towards the Huai River region to counter the enemy. This was because they had plenty of food supplies stockpiled upstream and had the water pathways to their advantage. Deng Ai received credit for his proposal.

Battle of Tao River 

Deng Ai later became a military adviser to the Wei general Xiahou Xuan and served as the Administrator of Nan'an Commandery (南安郡; around present-day Longxi and Wushan counties, Gansu). In 249, he followed Xiahou Xuan's successor Guo Huai to resist an invasion led by the Shu general Jiang Wei. After the Shu forces were repelled, Guo Huai advanced west to attack the Qiang tribes. Deng Ai cautioned him: "The enemy did not retreat far. They might turn back to attack us again, so we should split up our forces in case they attack us again."

Guo Huai then ordered Chen Tai, Xu Zhi and Deng Ai to lead Wei forces to attack the fortresses at Qushan and cut off their food and water supplies. Ju An and Li Xin led their men to taunt Deng Ai to attack them, but Deng Ai ignored them. As time passed, the two fortresses gradually ran out of supplies. Jiang Wei led his troops from Mount Niutou (牛頭山; west of present-day Zhaohua District, Guangyuan, Sichuan) to reinforce the fortresses. They encountered Chen Tai and his troops along the way. Chen Tai said: "The Art of War says that the best way to win a battle is to win without fighting. If we manage to occupy Mount Niutou, Jiang Wei's return route will be sealed off and he can be easily captured by us." He then ordered his troops to build forts to resist Jiang Wei's forces but refrain from engaging the enemy. At the same time, he also wrote to Guo Huai and requested his help in attacking Mount Niutou. Guo Huai did so and led his troops across the Tao River in preparation for attacking Mount Niutou.

Deng Ai remained behind and garrisoned at the north of Baishui County. Three days later, Jiang Wei sent Liao Hua to lead a force to approach Deng Ai's camp from the south of Baishui. Deng Ai told his officers: "Jiang Wei has turned back to attack us. We have few troops. Ideally, we should cross the river and not build a bridge. I believe Jiang Wei must have sent Liao Hua to hinder us so that we are forced to remain here, while he would attack Taocheng (洮城) from the east." Taocheng was located north of the river and was about 60 li away from Deng Ai's position. Deng Ai immediately dispatched troops to travel overnight to Taocheng to defend the fortress. As he expected, Jiang Wei crossed the river to attack Taocheng, but failed to capture the fortress because Deng Ai had already strengthened its defences. For his achievements, Deng Ai was enfeoffed as a Secondary Marquis, awarded the rank of General Who Attacks Rebels, and subsequently appointed as the Administrator of Chengyang Commandery (城陽郡; around present-day Zhucheng, Shandong).

Military advisor service 
Around the time, the Xiongnu prince Liu Bao, who was nominally a vassal under the Wei government, was gradually building up his military forces in Bing Province. Deng Ai wrote a memorial to the Wei imperial court: 

Deng Ai also suggested: "We should gradually segregate those Han Chinese living with barbarians, inculcate moral values such as integrity in them, so as to prevent them from resorting to unlawful actions." Sima Shi, the General-in-Chief who had recently taken over the reins of power as the regent of Wei, accepted Deng Ai's suggestions. He also appointed Deng Ai as the Administrator of Runan Commandery (汝南郡; in present-day southern Henan), where Deng lived in his younger days. Upon arriving in Runan to take office, Deng Ai sought a man who generously helped his father before because he wanted to repay that man for his kindness. However, he was disappointed to learn that the man had already died, so he sent his subordinates to pay respects at the man's tomb on his behalf. He also gave many gifts to the man's mother and recruited the man's son to be an accounting officer under him. During his tenure, Deng Ai developed wastelands in Runan and ensured that his soldiers and the common people had their basic needs fulfilled.

When the Wu regent Zhuge Ke retreated after a failed attempt to capture the Wei-controlled fortress at Hefei, Deng Ai approached the Wei regent Sima Shi and said:  As Deng Ai foresaw, Zhuge Ke was ousted from power not long after he returned to Wu and was killed along with his family.

Deng Ai was appointed as the Inspector of Yan Province and promoted to General Who Inspires Might. He wrote a memorial to the Wei imperial court:

Suppression of Second Shouchun rebellion 

Deng Ai was enfeoffed as the Marquis of Fangcheng Village after Cao Mao became the new Wei emperor in 254. In the following year, when the Wei generals Guanqiu Jian and Wen Qin started a rebellion in Shouchun (壽春; around present-day Shou County, Anhui), they sent messengers to other areas to incite the people to join their rebellion. Deng Ai arrested and executed the messengers, and then led troops to suppress the rebellion. His force occupied Yuejia (樂嘉; present-day Xiangcheng, Henan) and started building pontoon bridges. When the main Wei army led by Sima Shi showed up, Deng Ai rendezvoused with him and they advanced towards Shouchun together. The rebels were subsequently defeated. Deng Ai pursued the fleeing Wen Qin to Qiutou (丘頭; southeast of present-day Shenqiu County, Henan), but Wen Qin still managed to escape and defect to Wei's rival state, Wu.

The Wu general Sun Jun led thousands of troops and crossed the Yangtze to support the rebels. The Wei general Zhuge Dan ordered Deng Ai to resist the enemy at Feiyang, but Deng saw that if he was stationed in Feiyang he would be in a disadvantageous position, so he relocated his troops to a neighbouring village. He then sent Zhuge Xu to attack the remaining rebels and Wu forces at Lijiang Village (黎漿亭; southeast of present-day Shou County, Anhui), where they defeated the enemy.

In the same year, Deng Ai was promoted to Colonel of Changshui. Later on, for his contributions in suppressing the rebellion, he was further promoted to acting General Who Stabilises the West and his marquis rank was increased by one grade to Marquis of Fangcheng District.

Defending Wei territory  

Around 255, the Shu general Jiang Wei led forces to attack Wei and besieged Wang Jing, the Inspector of Yong Province, in Didao (狄道; southwest of present-day Lintao County, Gansu). The Wei imperial court appointed Deng Ai as General Who Stabilises the West and Colonel Who Protects the Eastern Qiang to lead troops to lift the siege. By then, Jiang Wei had withdrawn to Zhongti (鍾提; south of present-day Lintao County, Gansu), so many of Deng Ai's subordinates thought that Jiang Wei was exhausted and would not attack Didao again. However, Deng Ai held a different opinion and he said:  As Deng Ai predicted, Jiang Wei led his forces to attack Mount Qi later but were repelled by the defences set up by Deng. Jiang Wei retreated to Dong Village (董亭; south of present-day Wushan County, Gansu), while Deng Ai stationed his troops at Mount Wucheng. Jiang Wei tried to seize control of the mountainous terrain from Deng Ai, but was driven back. That night, Jiang Wei attempted to cross the Wei River to attack Shanggui (上邽; present-day Tianshui, Gansu). Deng Ai intercepted Jiang Wei at Duan Valley (段谷; southwest of present-day Tianshui, Gansu) and defeated him.

In 256, the Wei imperial court issued an edict as follows: 

In the following year, Jiang Wei advanced to the Mang river in his attempt to attack the position of Deng Ai and Sima Wang. However, both Wei generals refused to engage and held their position.

Deng Ai defeated Jiang Wei in battle again along the Great Wall and forced him to retreat back to Shu. He was further promoted to General Who Attacks the West, and had the number of taxable households in his marquisate increased to 6,600. 

In 262, he defeated Jiang Wei in battle at Houhe. Jiang Wei retreated to Tazhong (沓中; northwest of present-day Zhugqu County, Gansu) and garrisoned there.

Conquest of Shu

Strategic planning and opening moves
In the autumn of 263, the Wei imperial government started mobilising troops in preparation for a campaign against Shu. Sima Zhao, who oversaw the campaign, ordered Deng Ai to lead 30,000 troops to Tazhong (沓中; northwest of present-day Zhugqu County, Gansu) to harass Jiang Wei and keep him occupied, while Zhuge Xu, the Inspector of Yong Province, would lead forces to block Jiang Wei's retreat route back to Shu. Before Deng Ai embarked on the campaign against Shu, he dreamt of himself sitting on a mountaintop with water flowing near him. He asked an official, Yuan Shao, who was well-versed in the Yijing, to explain to him what his dream meant. Yuan Shao told him that he would successfully conquer Shu, but would not return to Wei. Deng Ai felt gloomy after hearing this.

Deng Ai sent Wang Qi to lead troops attack Jiang Wei's camp directly, with Qian Hong leading another force to clear the path, and Yang Xin to attack the enemy positions at Gansong (甘松; around present-day Songpan County, Sichuan).

When Jiang Wei received news that another Wei army led by Zhong Hui had occupied Hanzhong Commandery, he led his troops from Tazhong back further into Shu territory, but was pursued by Yang Xin to Qiangchuankou (彊川口; the intersection of the Bailong and Jialing rivers), where he was defeated. Jiang Wei learnt that Zhuge Xu had blocked his retreat route at the bridge of Yinping, so he led his men through Konghan Valley (孔函谷; south of present-day Xigu District, Lanzhou, Gansu) to the northern road in an attempt to bypass Zhuge Xu's position. When Zhuge Xu heard about it, he retreated back by 30 li. By then, Jiang Wei and his troops had travelled about 30 li on the northern road when they heard that Zhuge Xu had lifted the blockade at the bridge. Jiang Wei ordered his troops to quickly turn back and cross the bridge. Zhuge Xu tried to turn back to block Jiang Wei again but arrived at the bridge one day too late. After crossing the bridge, Jiang Wei moved to the mountain pass of Jiange and garrisoned there. Zhong Hui attacked Jiang Wei at Jiange several times but was unable to breach the defences.

Capture of the Shu capital 
Deng Ai proposed: 

Zhong Hui approved Deng Ai's idea and even ordered his subordinate Tian Zhang to join Deng Ai on the expedition. Some time between 18 November and 17 December 263, Deng Ai led a strike force from Yinping through the shortcut, bypassing the west of Jiange and heading straight towards Jiangyou. The shortcut covered a distance of more than 700 li and cut across mountainous terrain. Deng Ai and his men had to construct several bridges along the way. The mountains were high and the valleys were deep, which made the journey extremely dangerous. After some time, they were completely cut off from their supply train. Deng Ai wrapped himself in a large piece of felt and rolled down the mountain. His men climbed trees and scaled cliffs in single file. Along the way, they encountered three groups of Shu ambushers, defeated them and destroyed their camps. Deng Ai let Tian Zhang lead the vanguard and clear the path. Deng Ai and his vanguard showed up at Jiangyou. Ma Miao, the Shu-appointed administrator of Jiangyou, gave up resistance and surrendered to Deng Ai.

The Shu general Zhuge Zhan led an army from Fu County to Mianzhu, where they engaged Deng Ai and his troops in battle. Deng Ai ordered his son Deng Zhong to flank the enemy from the right, and Shi Zuan to flank the enemy from the left. Both Deng Zhong and Shi Zuan were driven back by Zhuge Zhan, and they told Deng Ai: "The enemy cannot be defeated.". Deng Ai sternly replied: "This battle will determine whether we live or die. What do you mean when you say the enemy cannot be defeated?" He wanted to execute them, but they turned back and hastily readied their troops for battle again. They defeated the Shu forces and killed the enemy officers Zhuge Zhan, Zhuge Shang and Zhang Zun.

Deng Ai and his men then pressed on further to Luo County (雒縣; north of present-day Guanghan, Sichuan). Liu Shan, the Shu emperor, sent an emissary to present his imperial seal to Deng Ai and indicate his wish to surrender.

Managing post-war Shu
When Deng Ai arrived in Chengdu, Liu Shan tied himself up and led an entourage of over 60 people to officially surrender. Deng Ai freed Liu Shan from his bonds and treated him kindly. He also forbid his soldiers from plundering and pillaging the city, and ordered that daily activities in the city resume as per normal. Many former Shu officials were so impressed with Deng Ai that they willingly submitted to him; the people of Shu also praised Deng Ai for his kindness. Deng Ai used his acting imperial authority granted by the Wei government to appoint Liu Shan as acting General of Chariots of Cavalry and grant titles to many former Shu nobles and officials; some of them became his subordinates. Deng Ai also appointed Shi Zuan as the Inspector of Yi Province and put Qian Hong in charge of overseeing the former Shu commanderies. A memorial was constructed at Mianzhu to glorify Deng Ai's victory over Zhuge Zhan, and the fallen Wei soldiers were buried alongside their Shu counterparts.

Deng Ai became arrogant about his achievements in conquering Shu. He once bragged to the former Shu officials: "All of you are lucky to have encountered me, which is why you are where you are today. If you encountered someone like Wu Han, you would have been destroyed." He also said: "Jiang Wei is a short-lived hero. He pales in comparison with me." Some people scorned him for his boastfulness.

On 8 February 264, the Wei imperial court issued an edict praising Deng Ai for his successful conquest of Shu and comparing him to famous generals such as Bai Qi, Han Xin, Wu Han and Zhou Yafu. Deng Ai was promoted to the position of Grand Commandant in the imperial court and had the number of taxable households in his marquisate increased by 20,000. His two sons were made village marquises and given 1,000 taxable households each in their marquisates.

Downfall and death

Correspondence between Deng Ai and Sima Zhao
Deng Ai wrote to Sima Zhao, suggesting that they let the weary troops rest and recuperate while concurrently making preparations for a future campaign against Wei's other rival state, Wu. He also proposed that Liu Shan be treated generously by making him a prince and showering him with luxuries. The purpose of doing so was to induce and tempt Sun Xiu, the Wu emperor, into voluntarily surrendering to Wei. He wrote: 

Sima Zhao sent Wei Guan to reply Deng Ai that his proposal would be submitted to the Wei imperial court for further deliberation before it could be implemented. Deng Ai grew impatient and argued that they would be wasting time if they had to wait for further instructions from the imperial court before taking action. He quoted lines from the Spring and Autumn Annals and The Art of War to hint that he was justified in ignoring standard protocol and acting autocratically as long as what he did was to Wei's benefit. He wrote:

Zhong Hui's role in Deng Ai's arrest

Zhong Hui, Hu Lie, Shi Zuan and others accused Deng Ai of showing disrespect for the Wei imperial court's authority, and claimed that he was likely to start a rebellion. The Shiyu mentioned that Zhong Hui was skilled in imitating people's handwriting. After getting his hands on a letter written by Deng Ai to Sima Zhao, he edited it to make it sound arrogant and demanding. At the same time, he also destroyed a letter from Sima Zhao to Deng Ai to increase Sima's suspicions towards Deng.

Sometime in late February or early March 264, the Wei imperial court then issued an edict ordering Deng Ai to be arrested and transported back to the capital, Luoyang. Wei Guan and Zhong Hui went to Deng Ai's camp, where they used Sima Zhao's letter to order Deng Ai's men to put down their weapons. Deng Ai was arrested and placed in a prison cart for his journey to Luoyang. When he was arrested, Deng Ai exclaimed: "I am a loyal subject, yet I meet with such a fate! Whatever that happened to Bai Qi in the past has just happened to me in the present."

Death
After Deng Ai was escorted away, Zhong Hui started a rebellion against Wei in Chengdu on 1 March 264, but the rebellion failed when some Wei officers, who were unwilling to participate, mutinied against Zhong Hui and killed him on 3 March 264. After Zhong Hui's death, Deng Ai's subordinates caught up with the convoy escorting their general, freed him, and brought him back to Chengdu. When Wei Guan heard about it, he ordered Tian Xu to lead troops to attack Deng Ai.

Tian Xu had initially served under Deng Ai during the campaign against Shu. During an earlier battle at Jiangyou, Deng Ai wanted to execute Tian Xu for delaying his advance against the enemy, but spared him eventually. When Wei Guan sent Tian Xu to attack Deng Ai, he told Tian, "You can now take revenge against Deng Ai for how he humiliated you at Jiangyou."

Tian Xu and his soldiers intercepted Deng Ai at the west of Mianzhu and killed him along with his son, Deng Zhong, and Shi Zuan. After Deng Ai's death, his other son(s) in Luoyang was/were also rounded up and executed, while his surviving family members were exiled to the Western Regions.

When the Wei general Du Yu heard about what Wei Guan told Tian Xu, he remarked that Wei Guan, as a man of high social status, should not behave in such a petty and spiteful manner. When Wei Guan heard about Du Yu's remarks, he immediately went to meet Du Yu to thank him.

Posthumous rehabilitation 
In February 266, after the Jin dynasty replaced the Wei regime, Sima Yan (Emperor Wu) issued an imperial edict to pardon Deng Ai's descendants and allow them to return from exile. He noted that Deng Ai was fairly punished for his arrogance and audacity, but the "redeeming" factor was that Deng Ai did not resist arrest and willingly resigned to his fate.

When Deng Ai was stationed in Yong and Liang provinces, he strengthened the parapets in the area and had some forts constructed for defensive purposes. During the mid-Taishi era (265–274) in Emperor Wu's reign, the Qiang tribes in Yong Province rebelled against Jin rule and killed the Inspector of Liang Province. The surviving officials and local residents found safety in the forts built by Deng Ai about a decade earlier.

Legacy

Family and descendants 
Deng Ai had at least two sons. Two of his sons – one of whom was Deng Zhong – held village marquis titles and owned marquisates of 1,000 taxable households. Deng Zhong was killed along with his father. Deng Ai's other sons who were in Luoyang were arrested and executed in the aftermath of their father's death. Deng Ai's surviving family members were exiled and allowed to return only in 265 after Emperor Wu of the Jin dynasty issued an imperial edict pardoning them.

In 273, Emperor Wu appointed Deng Ai's grandson, Deng Lang, as a langzhong. Deng Lang served as the Prefect of Danshui County (丹水縣; around present-day Xichuan County, Henan) and then as the Prefect of Dingling County (定陵縣; around present-day Qingyang County, Anhui). He had at least one son, Deng Tao. During the Yongjia era (307–313) in the reign of Emperor Huai, Deng Lang was appointed as the Administrator of Xindu Commandery (新都郡; around present-day Guanghan, Sichuan). However, before he left to assume office, he died in a fire in Xiangyang Commandery along with his mother, wife and children. Only his grandson Deng Xing, Deng Tao's son, survived the fire.

Deng Qianqiu, another grandson of Deng Ai, was recruited to serve under Wang Rong, a prominent Jin dynasty official. He died before Deng Lang while his two sons also perished in the Xiangyang fire.

Appraisal 
Chen Shou (233–297), who wrote Deng Ai's biography in the Sanguozhi, commented on Deng Ai as follows: "Deng Ai was upright and strong. He achieved many successes, but failed to protect himself from hidden pitfalls and dangers, which resulted in his eventual downfall. He could envision what would happen to Zhuge Ke, yet ironically could not foresee his own fate. This was probably what the ancients called 'lack of self-awareness and narrow-mindedness'."

In 267, Duan Zhuo wrote a memorial to Emperor Wu of the Jin dynasty to speak up for Deng Ai. In the memorial, Duan Zhuo discussed Deng Ai's contributions to Wei and argued that Deng had no intention of rebelling against Wei, citing Deng's advanced age (Deng was nearing 70 at the time of his death) as one reason. He also mentioned that Deng Ai had been deeply misunderstood because of his boorish and uncouth behaviour, which made him likely to offend people easily. Duan Zhuo also compared Deng Ai to Bai Qi and Wu Zixu, two generals in the Spring and Autumn period who made great contributions to their respective states but were forced to commit suicide.

During the mid-Xianning era (275–280) in Emperor Wu's reign, Fan Zhen, a general who previously served under Deng Ai during the Wei campaign against Shu, had an audience with the emperor. When Emperor Wu asked about Deng Ai, Fan Zhen became very emotional and he recalled that Deng Ai was a very loyal subject of Wei.

In popular culture 

Deng Ai is first introduced as a playable character in the seventh instalment of Koei's Dynasty Warriors video game series. In the game, he is erroneously associated with the Jin dynasty faction; historically, he died one year before the Jin dynasty was established.

See also
 Lists of people of the Three Kingdoms

Appendix

Notes

References 
Citations from the Sanguozhi
 

Citations from the Sanguozhi zhu

Other citations

Primary sources 
 Chen, Shou (3rd century). Records of the Three Kingdoms (Sanguozhi).
 Pei, Songzhi (5th century). Annotations to Records of the Three Kingdoms (Sanguozhi zhu).

Secondary sources 
 
 
 Sima, Guang (1084). Zizhi Tongjian.
 

197 births
264 deaths
Cao Wei generals
Cao Wei politicians
Generals from Henan
Political office-holders in Shandong
Politicians from Nanyang, Henan
Three Kingdoms people killed in battle
Stuttering
Three Rebellions in Shouchun